Phenylcopper is an organometallic chemical compound of copper.

Synthesis
Phenylcopper was the first known organocopper compound and was first prepared in 1923 from phenylmagnesium iodide and copper(I) iodide and in 1936 by Henry Gilman by transmetallation of phenylmagnesium iodide with copper(I) chloride.

Phenylcopper can be obtained by reacting phenyl lithium with copper(I) bromide in diethyl ether.

Properties
Phenylcopper is a colorless solid substance that is soluble in pyridine. It can be stored for a few days without decomposition under nitrogen or in vacuum. Rapid decomposition takes place in air. Water decomposes phenylcopper to form red copper (I) oxide and varying amounts of benzene and biphenyl. It forms stable complexes with tributylphosphine and triphenylphosphine.

When dissolved in dimethyl sulfide, phenylcopper forms dimers and trimers (aggregates of two or three molecules).

Related
A diphenylcuprate(I) ion exists that can form a salt with lithium. (Li+[Cu(C6H5)2]−).

See also
Organocopper compound

References

Organocopper compounds
Phenyl compounds